Jinhua Rail Transit (simplified Chinese: 金华轨道交通; traditional Chinese: 金華軌道交通; pinyin: Jīnhuá Guǐ​dào Jiāotōng) is a suburban rapid transit system in the prefecture-level city of Jinhua, in Zhejiang Province, China. It opened on 30 August 2022.

History
A groundbreaking ceremony was held on 28 July 2017.

The Jinyi section of the Jinyidong line opened on 30 August 2022.

Lines

Jinyidong line

Jinyi section

The Jinyi section runs from Jinhua to Yiwu. It starts at the Jinhua railway station and heads east via . It terminates at Qintang station. The Jinyi section opened on 30 August 2022. It is colored red on official system maps.

Yidong section

the Yidong section runs from Yiwu to Dongyang.
It starts at Yiwu railway station and heads south. It terminates at Ming & Qing Dynasty Palaces station. Furthermore, it interchanges with the Jinyi section at Qintang station. The Yidong section is expected to open in late 2022. It is also colored red on official system maps.

Jinwuyongdong line (Planned)

Jinwuyongdong line, or Jinhua-Wuyi-Yongkang-Dongyang line, starts at Luodian and heads south. It terminates at Ming & Qing Dynasty Palaces station. It interchanges with the Yidong section at Ming & Qing Dynasty Palaces station and with the Jinyi section at South Bayi Street station. The line will be  in length and has 26 stations (15 underground, 11 elevated). The line is under planning.

References

Jinhua Rail Transit